The Cachoeira da Fumaça e Jacuba Natural Park is a municipal nature park in the state of Rio de Janeiro, Brazil.

Location

The Cachoeira da Fumaça e Jacuba Natural Park is located in the municipality of Resende, Rio de Janeiro.
The vegetation is mainly dense rainforest.

The main attraction is the Preto River's Cachoeira da Fumaça (Smoke Falls) on the border between Rio de Janeiro and Minas Gerais.
The falls were listed as Cultural Heritage and Landscape of Resende by Municipal Decree 043 of 1999.

History

The Cachoeira da Fumaça e Jacuba Natural Park was created by decree 197 of 28 December 1988.
The park was included in the Mantiqueira Mosaic, created on 11 December 2006.
It was re-categorized by decree 3177 of 30 April 2009.
The park is managed by the municipal environmental agency.

Notes

Sources

Protected areas of Rio de Janeiro (state)
Protected areas established in 1988
1988 establishments in Brazil
Municipal nature parks of Brazil